Newdigate (also spelled Newdegate) is a surname of English origin.

People with the name Newdigate include:

 John Newdigate (1600–1642), English politician 
 Roger Newdigate (1719–1806), English politician and collector of antiquities
 Sir Richard Newdigate, 1st Baronet (1602–1678), MP for Tamworth, 1660
 Sir Richard Newdigate, 2nd Baronet (1644–1710), MP for Warwickshire, 1681–85 and 1689–90
 Richard Newdigate (1679–1745), MP for Newark-on-Trent, 1710–15
 Sebastian Newdigate (1500–1535), Carthusian monk

People with the name Newdegate include:
 Charles Newdigate Newdegate, British politician
 Edward Newdegate, British general
 Francis Newdegate, Governor of Tasmania and Western Australia
 Francis FitzRoy Newdegate, 3rd Viscount Daventry

See also
Newdigate baronets
Newdegate (disambiguation)

References

English-language surnames
Surnames of English origin